Varda is a town and a community in the municipal unit of Vouprasia, Elis, Greece. It was the seat of the former municipality Vouprasia. The community Varda consists of the town Varda and the villages Kougaiika, Komi, Sympanio and Psari. Varda is situated in the plains near the Ionian Sea, and east of the Kotychi lagoon. It is 2 km southeast of Manolada, 3 km southwest of Nea Manolada, 14 km northeast of Lechaina and 40 km southwest of Patras. The railway from Patras to Pyrgos passes west of the town, and the Greek National Road 9 (Patras - Pyrgos) passes east of the town.

Population

Komi
The village Komi is situated in a rural area at the foot of low hills, 2 km east of Varda town centre. Its population was 97 in 2011. Komi was one of the villages that was settled with Arvanites after the Black Death (1347–1350) had devastated much of Elis' population. The other villages were Basta, Kaloletsi and Milies. In the beginning of the 20th century, its inhabitants spoke both Greek and Arvanitika.

Psari
The village Psari ( meaning "fish") is situated at the foot of low hills, 2 km southeast of Varda town centre. Its population was 261 in 2011. Neapoli is 3 km to the east.

External links
 Varda on GTP Travel Pages

See also

List of settlements in Elis

References

Vouprasia
Populated places in Elis